The 2019 European Parliament election in Austria was held in Austria on 26 May 2019 to elect the country's 18 members of the European Parliament. The Austrian People's Party (ÖVP) gained two seats for a total of seven, while the Freedom Party of Austria (FPÖ) and The Greens each lost one.

The election took place nine days after the start of the Ibiza affair, which led to the resignation of Vice-Chancellor and FPÖ leader Heinz-Christian Strache and the collapse of the federal ÖVP–FPÖ government. The European election was seen as a victory for the ÖVP and a defeat for the FPÖ, who were forecasted to perform substantially better.

Contesting parties
The table below lists parties elected in the 2014 European Parliament election.

Seven parties contested the election. In addition to the five already represented in the European Parliament, two more collected enough signatures to appear on the ballot:

 KPÖ Plus – European Left, Open List (KPÖ)
 EUROPE NOW! – Initiative Johannes Voggenhuber (EUROPA)

Facts and statistics
According to final numbers, a total of 6,416,202 people aged 16+ are eligible to vote in this election, an increase from 6,410,602 people in the 2014 election. 3,312,745 women (2014: 3,322,498) and 3,103,457 men (2014: 3,088,104) are eligible to vote. Included in these totals are 44,718 Austrians living abroad and 38,668 foreign EU-citizens living in Austria.

Poll opening and closing times on election day are set individually by each municipality. Poll closing times can be no later than 5 pm. Results will be released at 11 pm (after Italy closes their polls).

Voters are allowed to cast their vote by postal ballot. Postal ballots have to arrive at the district voting commission no later than 5 pm on election day and will be counted on Monday, 27 May – starting at 9 am.

A total of 686,249 postal ballots have been requested by voters, up from 444,057 – an increase of 55% – compared with the 2014 election.

Campaign
In the lead up to the 2019 European Parliament election in Austria, in what The Guardian described as "doubling down" on rhetoric ahead of the election, FPO Vice Chancellor of Austria Heinz-Christian Strache endorsed the far-right conspiracy of the great replacement. He claimed that "population replacement" was real, adding: "We don’t want to become a minority in our own country".

Ibiza affair
The Ibiza affair, also known as Ibiza-gate, was a political scandal in Austria involving Heinz-Christian Strache, the former Vice-Chancellor of Austria and leader of the Freedom Party (FPÖ), Johann Gudenus, a deputy leader of the Freedom Party, and both the Austrian Freedom Party and Austria's political landscape in general.

The scandal started on 17 May 2019 with the publication of a secretly recorded video of a meeting in Ibiza, Spain, in July 2017, which appears to show the then opposition politicians Strache and Gudenus discussing their party's underhanded practices and intentions. In the video, both politicians appeared receptive to proposals by a woman posing as the niece of a Russian oligarch, discussing how to provide the FPÖ with positive news coverage in return for government contracts. Strache and Gudenus also hinted at corrupt political practices involving numerous other wealthy donors to the FPÖ in Europe and elsewhere.

The scandal caused the resignation of Strache and Gudenus, the collapse of the Austrian governing ÖVP-FPÖ coalition on 18 May 2019 and the announcement of an early legislative election in September.

Opinion polls

Graphical summary

Vote share

Results
The numbers in brackets denote changes in seat distribution caused by Brexit.

Results by state

Notes

References

External links
Official results from the Interior Ministry (starting at 23:00 / 11 PM (CET) on Sunday, May 26) 

Austria
European Parliament elections in Austria
Europe
Europe